The 2021 Kerala Legislative Assembly election was held in Kerala on 6 April 2021 to elect 140 members to the 15th Kerala Legislative Assembly. The results were declared on 2 May.

The election saw the incumbent Left Democratic Front (LDF) retaining power with 99 seats, 8 more than in the previous election, marking the first time that an alliance won consecutive terms in the state since its 1977 election. The United Democratic Front (UDF) won the remaining 41 seats, 6 less than in the previous election. The National Democratic Alliance (NDA) received a dip in vote share and lost their lone seat. Pinarayi Vijayan became the first Chief Minister of Kerala to be re-elected after completing a full, five-year term in office.

Background
Kerala has a unicameral house of legislation, Niyamasabha, consisting of 140 members elected from individual constituencies and one nominated member from the Anglo-Indian community. Members are elected for a period of five years, unless the assembly is dissolved earlier. Fourteen and two constituencies respectively are reserved for members belonging to Scheduled Castes (SC) and Scheduled Tribes (ST). The tenure of the members of the 14th Legislative Assembly in the state ended on 1 June 2021.

As with all assembly elections in India, Kerala uses first-past-the-post election system. Voters are given a provision to vote NOTA (None Of The Above). State Election Commission, Kerala conducts the assembly election and is overseen by Election Commission of India.

Changes in alliance compositions 
In the previous election in 2016, the LDF bagged 91 seats in the assembly, defeating the incumbent UDF, led by the Indian National Congress (INC), which could only win 47 seats in the election. The Bharatiya Janata Party (BJP) won one seat, and the remaining seat was won by an independent, P. C. George, who later formed the party Kerala Janapaksham (Secular).

After being suspended from UDF, Kerala Congress (M), led by Jose K. Mani, joined LDF. However, a faction of the party, led by P. J. Joseph, remained in UDF and formed Kerala Congress.   

Another major change that occurred after 2016 was the entry of 4 parties, including Loktantrik Janata Dal and Indian National League, into LDF.

2020 local elections 
In the 2020 Kerala local elections held in December, LDF performed strong, including a lead in 11 out of 14 district panchayats in the state.

The induction of Kerala Congress (M) gave inroads to LDF in the traditional UDF strongholds of Kottayam district and nearby areas with large number of Syrian Christian voters.

After the local elections, A. Vijayaraghavan, the new state secretary of Communist Party of India (Marxist), repeatedly alleged that UDF had secret alliance with the fundamentalist organisations like Jamaat-e-Islami.

2021 
In February 2021, Nationalist Congress Party (NCP) leader Mani C. Kappan, the sitting MLA of Pala constituency, switched to the UDF after the LDF denied his request to contest in Pala constituency in the election. This resulted in his expulsion from NCP, following which he formed a new political party named Nationalist Congress Kerala (NCK).

In March 2021, R. Balasankar, leader of Rashtriya Swayamsevak Sangh from Alappuzha, claimed that the Kerala leadership of BJP had struck a secret deal with CPI(M) to weaken and ensure the defeat of UDF, a claim denied by BJP.  On 17 March 2021, P. C. Thomas announced the merger of his party with P. J. Joseph's Kerala Congress, with him being its Deputy Chairman.

Schedule

Parties and alliances 
The Left Democratic Front (LDF) is a coalition of centre-left to left-wing political parties, led by the Communist Party of India (Marxist) (CPIM). The United Democratic Front (UDF) is an alliance of centrist to centre-left political parties led by the Indian National Congress (INC). The National Democratic Alliance (NDA) led by Bharatiya Janata Party (BJP) is a coalition of centrist to right-wing parties.

An alliance of centre-left to left-wing political parties, the LDF is currently in power. The coalition consists of CPI(M), CPI and several smaller parties.

It is an alliance of centrist to centre-left political parties in the state, founded by the prominent Congress party leader K. Karunakaran in 1978.

It is an alliance of right-wing parties. NDA Kerala unit was constituted in 2016. The coalition consists of Bharatiya Janata Party, Bharath Dharma Jana Sena and a variety of other smaller parties.

Campaign 
On 28 February 2021, the Left Democratic Front (LDF) released its campaign slogan for the Assembly election, "Urappanu LDF" (Malayalam: ഉറപ്പാണ് LDF) which translates to "LDF for sure". The alliance released its manifesto on 19 March.

The United Democratic Front (UDF) released their campaign slogan "Naadu Nannakan UDF" (നാട് നന്നാകാൻ UDF) which roughly translates to ‘UDF for Kerala’s Advancement'. The UDF released their election manifesto on 20 March 2020.

The BJP- led National Democratic Alliance released their campaign slogan "Puthiya Keralam Modikkoppam" (Malayalam: പുതിയ കേരളം മോദിക്കൊപ്പം) which roughly translates to 'New Kerala with Modi.' BJP pledged to ban Love Jihad if elected to power.

Candidates 

Many parties, including the CPI(M), the INC and the CPI, did not give tickets to most sitting MLAs who had already served two terms. A third of selected candidates had prior experience in local bodies. The Indian Union Muslim League fielded a female candidate - Noorbeena Rasheed in Kozhikode South - for the first time in 25 years. Anannyah Kumari Alex, contesting from Vengara, became the first ever transgender candidate to be nominated for Kerala assembly election, However, she suspended her campaign after alleged harassment from her party members. 

Nominations of NDA candidates in Thalassery, Guruvayur and Devikulam were rejected by the Election Commission, citing incomplete nomination papers. Hence, the alliance offered support Democratic Social Justice Party (DSJP) candidate in Guruvayur, AIADMK candidate in Devikulam and for an independent candidate in Thalassery, however the latter rejected the support.

Opinion polls

Asianet News–C fore Survey (July 2020)

Exit polls 
Exit polls were published after 7:30pm IST on 29 April, as per orders from Election Commission of India.

Election

Voting

Result

Summary 

The incumbent LDF retained power with 99 seats, 8 more than in the previous election. This marks the first time an alliance has won consecutive terms in the state since 1977. The UDF won 41 seats, 6 less than before, although their vote share increased. The NDA lost their lone seat in Nemom and suffered a significant loss in vote-share. P. C. George, Kerala Janapaksham (Secular) candidate in Poonjar and the only MLA not part of any alliance, lost his sitting seat to the LDF, coming second. Twenty20 Kizhakkambalam came third in both Kunnathunad and Kochi seats.

Besides Poonjar, Kunnathunad, and Kochi, the NDA dropped to fourth position in Vengara, where an independent candidate overtook the BJP to become third. The Revolutionary Marxist Party of India opened its account in the State Legislative assembly, winning from Vadakara, a left-socialist stronghold, with outside support of UDF. In Pala, Mani C. Kappen won as a UDF Independent candidate.

K. K. Shailaja, who as Health Minister had won plaudits for her handling of the COVID-19 pandemic, was re-elected in Mattanur with a record majority of 67,013 votes. K. A. Shaji of Down to Earth pointed to the LDF government's success in minimising covid deaths and reducing economic hardship of people affected by the lockdown as the primary cause for its re-election.

In the aftermath of the election, leaders of LDF and UDF have alleged collusion of one another with BJP in an effort to undermine theirs.

By alliance

By region

By district

By constituency

By-elections

Aftermath

Government formation 
The incumbent Chief Minister Pinarayi Vijayan was sworn in on 20 May along with 20 other cabinet members, 18 of whom were fresh faces. The exclusion of incumbent Health Minister K. K. Shailaja from the cabinet drew criticism from the public and from some CPI(M) members. The swearing-in ceremony, which was restricted to 500 participants due to a state-wide lockdown, was not attended by opposition MLAs and representatives from Central government, citing COVID protocol concerns.

V. D. Satheesan replaced Ramesh Chennithala as the Leader of the Opposition in the Niyamasabha, after the decision was made by the Congress High Command.

Kodakara hawala scandal
A few weeks after announcement of election results, allegations were raised against BJP leadership of Kerala for carrying illegal black money (hawala), in relation to the 2021 election. Kerala Police seized ₹3.5 crore in cash at Kodakara 3 days before the election. The money was allegedly looted and was to be used for BJP's election campaign. BJP state president K. Surendran was the chief accused in the case. The case was later handed over to Enforcement Directorate.

Other events 
On 20 March 2023, Kerala High Court nullified the election in Devikulam, where elected members are required to belong to Scheduled Castes (SC), after establishing that the elected MLA, A. Raja of CPI(M), did not belong to SC community and was hence ineligible to be elected from the constituency.

Notes

References

2021 State Assembly elections in India
State Assembly elections in Kerala
2020s in Kerala